The 1978 National League was contested as the second division of Speedway in the United Kingdom.

Summary
Newport Dragons dropped out of the league after just one season of second tier racing, however two new entrants - Milton Keynes Knights and Barrow Furness Flyers - saw the league expanded to twenty teams. Weymouth changed their nickname from Wizards to Wildcats.

Canterbury Crusaders won the National League title. Although equal on points with Newcastle Diamonds they won by virtue of the fact that their race points difference was greater than their rival. It was Canterbury's second title win in eight years, previously winning in 1970. The Crusaders were led by heavy scoring from Les Rumsey and Riders' Champion Steve Koppe, while Newcastle's Tom Owen topped the averages for the second consecutive year.

Earlier in the season 18 year-old junior rider Chris Prime was representing Newcastle when he was killed in the National League match against Mildenhall on 3 April.

Final table

National League Knockout Cup
The 1978 National League Knockout Cup was the 11th edition of the Knockout Cup for tier two teams. Eastbourne Eagles were the winners of the competition for the second successive year.

First round

Second round

Quarter-finals

Semi-finals

Final
First leg

Second leg

Eastbourne were declared Knockout Cup Champions, winning on aggregate 83–73.

Top Five Riders

Riders & final averages
Barrow

Charlie Monk 8.20
Geoff Pusey 7.22
Chris Bevan 6.82
Andy Reid 5.53
Chris Roynon 5.01
Ken Murray 4.23
Mark Courtney 3.61
Chris Robins 3.13
Malcolm Chambers 2.29
Gary Pottenger 2.29
Les Race 1.74
Dave Butt 1.73
Des Wilson 1.25

Berwick

Graham Jones 8.79 
Roger Wright 7.66
Mike Hiftle 6.40
Willie Templeton 6.12
Mike Fullerton 6.02
Dave Gifford 5.62
Colin Caffrey 4.25
Wayne Brown 3.94
Ian Darling 2.72

Boston

Gary Guglielmi 8.38
Tony Boyle 7.95
Steve Clarke 7.11
Dave Allen 7.02
Paul Gilbert 6.50
Stuart Cope 5.36
Andy Fisher 5.33
Craig Featherby 5.26
Dave Mortiboys 4.94
Ron Cooper 4.13
Roger Lambert 4.00
Keith Bloxsome 3.79
Dennis Mallett 2.93

Canterbury

Les Rumsey 9.81
Steve Koppe 9.68
Graham Banks 8.11
Mike Ferreira 7.65
Bob Spelta 7.54
Graham Clifton 7.48
Brendan Shiletto 6.58
Barney Kennett 6.48
Dave Piddock 5.65
Derek Hole 3.71

Crayford

Laurie Etheridge 9.34
Alan Sage 8.63
Alan Johns 6.28
Pete Wigley 5.19
Richard Davey 5.18
Tony Featherstone 5.02
John Hooper 4.36

Eastbourne

Mike Sampson 9.74 
Dave Kennett 8.93
Eric Dugard 8.88 
Roger Abel 7.40
Steve Naylor 7.31
Paul Woods 6.64
Colin Ackroyd 5.94
John Barker 5.78

Edinburgh

Rob Hollingworth 7.39
Bert Harkins 7.17
Steve Lomas 6.93
Dave Trownson 6.55
Brian Collins 6.04
Steve McDermott 6.00
Ivan Blacka 5.11
Alan Morrison 4.67
Alan Bridgett 4.75
Mark Stokes 2.00

Ellesmere Port

John Jackson 10.36
Steve Finch 9.28 
Phil Collins 8.70 
John Williams 5.77
Louis Carr 5.73 
Paul Tyrer 5.13 
Pete Ellams 4.39
Steve Taylor 4.06
Neil Collins 2.87

Glasgow

Steve Lawson 7.93 
Derek Richardson 7.52 
Merv Janke 7.51 
Benny Rourke 6.68
Colin Farquharson 4.64
Jim Beaton 4.49
Charlie McKinna 3.54
Keith Bloxsome 3.50
Terry Kelly 3.48
Mick Newton 2.97

Mildenhall

Ray Bales 9.12
Bob Coles 8.35 
Melvyn Taylor 8.35
Robert Henry 6.47
Neil Leeks 6.31
Mike Spink 6.26
Mick Bates 5.43
Richard Knight 4.31

Milton Keynes

Bob Humphreys 10.59 
Derek Harrison 6.87
Chris Robins 6.52
Andy Grahame 6.17
Malcolm Holloway 5.39
Cliff Anderson 4.93 
Phil Bass 4.82
Harry MacLean 4.57
Richard Evans 3.04

Newcastle

Tom Owen 10.82 
Robbie Blackadder 9.10 
Kenny Carter 7.58 
Robbie Gardner 7.40 
Graeme Stapleton 6.55 
Rod Hunter 6.54
Neil Coddington 4.16
Nigel Crabtree 3.56

Oxford

George Hunter 9.53 
David Shields 8.75
John Hack 7.37
Carl Askew 7.08 
Colin Meredith 6.87
Pip Lamb 6.39
James Moore 5.81
Mick Handley 5.47
Les Sawyer 3.26

Peterborough

Dave Gooderham 8.36
Ian Clark 8.03
Andy Hines 7.97
Nigel Flatman 7.48
Kevin Hawkins 6.67 
Tim Hunt 6.54
Brian Clark 6.38
Nigel Couzens 6.07
Peter Spink 4.74

Rye House

Ted Hubbard 9.32 
Kelvin Mullarkey 9.11
Karl Fiala 7.81 
Hugh Saunders 7.74
Bobby Garrad 7.52
Ashley Pullen 6.86
Peter Tarrant 4.85
Bob Cooper 4.84
Kevin Smith 4.82

Scunthorpe

Nicky Allott 9.03
John McNeil 7.96
Arthur Browning 6.03
Phil White 5.63
Mick Handley 4.29
Danny Boyle 4.00
Trevor Whiting 4.00
Danny Young 3.47
Paul Cooper 2.77
John Priest 2.24

Stoke

Tony Lomas 9.07 
Ian Gledhill 7.45
John Harrhy 6.98 
Stuart Mountford 6.93
Ian Robertson 6.89
Tim Nunan 6.20
Frank Smith 6.05
Ian Jeffcoate 4.20

Teesside
 
Steve Wilcock 7.94
Nigel Close 7.39
Pete Smith 7.23
Pete Reading 6.13
Martyn Cusworth 4.75
Peter Spink 4.46
Martin Dixon 4.09
Bob Watts 3.79
John Robson 3.14
Dave Gatenby 2.90

Weymouth

Danny Kennedy 9.16
Malcolm Shakespeare 7.49
Sean Willmott 6.96
Malcolm Corradine 6.76
Geoff Swindells 6.56
Gary Ford 5.46
Mick Conroy 3.77
Nigel Davis 2.83

Workington

Arthur Price 8.63 
Brian Havelock 8.39
Rob Maxfield 7.66
Ian Hindle 6.40
Mark Dickinson 5.14
David Coles 4.82
Andy Margarson 4.79
Des Wilson 4.43
Tony Childs 3.27

See also
List of United Kingdom Speedway League Champions
Knockout Cup (speedway)

References

Speedway British League Division Two / National League